White Shadow is an American rock band from Chicago IL that formed in mid-2006.  Since their formation, the band has gained a large following in the northwest suburbs of Chicago for their strong song writing and their high energy performances.  The band released their debut EP on iTunes, White Shadow – Single, on Sept 17th, 2011.  The album was recorded at RaxTrax in Chicago.

History
The band was formed in 2006 when the band members were very young and all in grade school.  Specifically Ryan and Andrew were in 3rd grade and Daniel was in 2nd grade.  The boys’ musical ambitions were launched when the Cielak’s father introduced Andrew and Daniel to the heavy metal band Black Sabbath while the boys were still in 2nd grade.  They played in their garage and basement and began to build a following through talent shows and several smaller gigs.  2010 and 2011 were their breakout years when they competed in nine Battle of Bands throughout Illinois and won nearly every one of them with strong original songs, musicianship, and high energy stage performances.  Their first gig back in their hometown was winning the Battle of the Bands at the Grove Avenue Carnival.  In late 2011 they issued their first EP on iTunes, Amazon, Spotify, etc.  They were featured on a READ poster by the American Library Association and join a list of celebrities like Bill Gates, Bill Cosby, Ice Cube, and Yao Ming in that program.  They also participated in a benefit for the Joplin MO tornado disaster called “Jammin’ for Joplin.”  They are played a California tour in March 2012 at Whisky a Go Go.

Band members
	The band is made up of three members, including brothers Andrew and Daniel Cielak.

Andrew  Cielak – Bass, harmonica, vocals
Daniel Cielak – Drums, vocals
Ryan Woodlock – Guitar, vocals

Discography
 White Shadow – Single (2011)

References

Alternative rock groups from Chicago